Ānantarya Karma (Sanskrit) or Ānantarika Kamma (Pāli)  are the most serious offences in Buddhism that, at death, through the overwhelming karmic strength of any single one of them, bring immediate disaster. Both Buddhists and non-Buddhists must avoid them at all costs. Such offenses prevent perpetrators from attaining any of the stages of enlightenment and from ordaining into the Sangha. The offences are:

 Killing one's mother
 Killing one's father
 Killing an Arahant
 Wounding a Tathagata
 Creating schism in the Sangha (Anguttara iii 440)

Ānantarika Kamma is so serious that even Amitabha Buddha abandoned all hope. His Vow 18 reads:

There are another five unlisted Ānantarika Kamma offences found in the scriptures:

 Physically obstructing the Lord Buddha's path
 Rejecting the Lord Buddha's claim to supernatural insight
 Accusing the Lord Buddha or an Arhat of sexual misconduct
 Wounding an Arhat
 Raping ordained monastics

Physically obstructing the Lord Buddha's path 

When Suppabuddha blocked the Lord Buddha's path, forcing him to turn back, he was reborn in hell.

Rejecting the Lord Buddha's claim to supernormal insight 

Some people rejected the Buddha's claim to supernormal insight, saying:

The Buddha said that unless such people abandon these assertions and relinquish such views, they would be cast into hell. (Majjhima i 71)

Accusing the Lord Buddha or an Arahant of sexual misconduct 

1) The Bodhisatta accused Paccekabuddhas Surabhi and Sabbābhibhu of sexual misconduct and was consigned to hell.

2) The bhikkhu  Kokālika accused Sāriputta and Moggallāna of having unvirtuous desires and was consigned to hell. (Suttanipata p. 123).

3) Ciñcā Māṇavikā accused the Buddha of sleeping with her and was consigned to hell.

Wounding an Arahant 
When MahaMoggallana was Mara Dusi, he made a young boy attack the chief disciple of a previous Buddha and split his head. For this, Dusi was cast into hell.

Usually it is the killing of the Arahant that counts.

Raping ordained monastics

Raping nuns: Ānantarika Kamma 

A group of nuns on the road to Savatthi were raped (ekaccā bhikkhuṇiyo dusesuṃ). The Buddha said those who rape nuns should not be ordained (bhikkhuṇidusako na upasampādetabbo) (Vinaya i 089). The danger of raping nuns is this: the man who raped (dusesi) the nun Uppalavanna was cast into hell. The rule against ordaining, and the descent into hell, are both signs of Ānantarika Kamma.

Raping monks: Ānantarika Kamma 

The rape of monks and novices is likely Ānantarika Kamma, too. just as ordination confers special protection on women, it likely confers the same protection on men. The definition of sexual misconduct does not discriminate between the sexes (M i 286).

Other considerations

The different meanings of Dussati: rape, fondle, molest, make love 

 A group of nuns on the road to Savatthi were raped (ekaccā bhikkhuṇiyo dusesuṃ). 

 In the course of showing her round his new hut, Udayin fondled a visitor's wife 'limb by limb' and was accused of molesting her (duseyyu ti, Vinaya iii 119).
 A doctor treating a nun, lanced a boil 'in the area between her navel and knees,' then started to molest her (dūsetuṃ upakkami) (Vinaya iv 316).

 Then the layman Sāḷha asked the nun Sundarīnandā : “What is wrong with you? Why are you lying down?” “Surely, it is this, sir: you do not want me.” “How could I not want you? But I never had a chance to make love with you” (okāsaṃ na labhāmi taṃ dūsetun ti). Then, filled with lust, Sāḷha touched the nun Sundarīnandā, who was also filled with lust (avassuto avassutāya sundarīnandāya bhikkhuniyā kāyasaṃsaggaṃ samapajji).

Relations with consenting monastics 

Ānantarika Kamma involves actions undertaken without consent. Acts that are consensual are not Ānantarika Kamma, however unskilful they may be.

For example:

 two nuns sexually abuse each other: Pacittiya offence (Vinaya iv 261).
 a monk invites a novice to sexually abuse him: Sanghadisesa offence (Sd 1, case 29; Vinaya iii 118).
 a monk or nun consents to sex: Parajika offence (Vinaya iii 040).

If a woman rapes a monk it is Ānantarika Kamma: if she seduces him, it is not.

Sexually abusing laywomen: Sanghadisesa offence

Sexually abusing laywomen is a Sanghadisesa Offence. For example, a monk sexually abusing a baby girl (Vinaya iii 35).

Five precepts infringements 
Hell usually is the result of repeated infringements of the five precepts. Therefore such infringements are not Anantarika Karma (A iv 248).

Abuse of child novices 
Although the Buddha strongly condemned the sexual harm of children, there are, in Vinaya, no extra provisions made to ensure the safety of young children in community life. Thus, even today, across the world, children of all ages are being trained in monasteries without proper safeguarding.

Although children were in early Buddhism initially prohibited from ordaining under fifteen years of age (Vin i 079), this standard was eventually relinquished to admit them even at seven years old (Vin i 079). But not only are there no special safeguards for the under thirteens, for example, Vinaya even seems to minimise the danger. For example, the bhikkhu who accidentally killed a young girl by penetrating her with his thumb, was not obliged to disrobe (Vin iii 034). And the monk who sexually assaulted a sleeping novice was judged guilty of a minor offence.(V iii 117). These two stories may perplex the modern reader, but there is no scriptural justification to discount them. 

The Buddha made it clear that religious texts of all traditions, even his own, may on occasions be corrupted. Mistakes and errors can creep in (M i 520). Therefore, one cannot categorically argue, on the basis of scriptures, how seriously to regard the abuse of child novices. Although there is no justification for saying child abuse is Anantarika Karma, there is but little justification for saying it is not. As explained above, the fact that they are in robes, means that all monastics should be treated with extraordinary respect.
.

Citations to Pali text

All citations in this article are to the Pali Text Society Pali page numbers. For example, (Majjhima ii 156), means PTS Majjhima Nikaya, Volume 2, page 156.

See also
 Ajatashatru
 Avijjā
 Buddhist views on sin
 Devadatta
 Karma in Buddhism
 Merit (Buddhism)
 Moha (Buddhism)
 Pratitya-samutpada
 Samsara (Buddhism)
 Three Poisons
 Twelve Nidanas

References

Further reading
 Silk, Jonathan A. (2007). Good and Evil in Indian Buddhism: The Five Sins of Immediate Retribution, Journal of Indian Philosophy 35 (3), 253-286

Buddhist philosophical concepts
Karma in Buddhism